Michael Steven McGrady (born March 30, 1960) is an American theater, film and television actor. He is known for playing Tom Matthews in Beyond. He is also an artist.

Life and work
McGrady was born in Federal Way, Washington, to Gloria, a hair salon owner, and George McGrady, an airline mechanic. He attended Federal Way High School and the University of Washington, majoring in Business Administration. He currently splits his time between Southern California and Washington State, with his wife Ilka .

McGrady had planned to become a lawyer and was working at a bank when his sister entered him in a contest for a scholarship to a local acting school. After that McGrady moved to California to pursue his dream of becoming an actor. He was cast in a Cherry Pepsi commercial. He has worked steadily in the industry since. He guest starred in several popular television shows such as 24, Murder She Wrote, CSI: Miami, Leverage and Prison Break. McGrady played Sal Salinger on the TNT drama Southland, which premiered in April 2009. The show was cancelled by NBC after its first season, but cable channel TNT bought the rights for the show and ordered seven new episodes.  He has also been seen as recurring character Frank Barnes on Showtime's Ray Donovan and appeared as Detective Philip Vanatter on FX's American Crime Story: The People v. O. J. Simpson.

McGrady gave his voice and likeness to Rockstar Games period video game L.A. Noire as Rusty Galloway, and most recently appeared in the film Freelancers. He starred in Low Winter Sun for AMC as Brendan McCann, and as Cy in the independent feature Under The Harvest Moon. He played Detective John Gentile in The Frozen Ground. He is also a painter.

Selected filmography

References

External links

American male film actors
American male television actors
Male actors from Washington (state)
People from Federal Way, Washington
1960 births
Living people